Rogério Moraes Lourenço (born March 20, 1971 in Rio de Janeiro), is a Brazilian football manager and former centre back.

He has managed Saudi Arabia Under-20 team since 28 March 2011.

Titles

As a player
 Flamengo
Taça Guanabara: 1988, 1989, 2001
Copa do Brasil: 1990
Taça Rio: 1991, 2000
Campeonato Carioca: 1991, 2000, 2001
Campeonato Brasileiro Série A: 1992
 Cruzeiro
Campeonato Mineiro: 1996, 1997
Copa do Brasil: 1996
Copa Libertadores: 1997

As a manager
 Brazil U-20
South American Youth Championship: 2009

References

1971 births
Living people
Brazilian footballers
Brazilian football managers
Brazil youth international footballers
Brazil under-20 international footballers
CR Flamengo footballers
Cruzeiro Esporte Clube players
CR Vasco da Gama players
Paraná Clube players
Fluminense FC players
Vila Nova Futebol Clube players
CR Flamengo managers
Brazil national under-20 football team managers
Esporte Clube Bahia managers
Association football defenders
Footballers from Rio de Janeiro (city)